Nick Lindahl (born 31 July 1988) is a former Australian tennis player. As a junior, he reached the final of the Boys' Singles at the 2006 Australian Open. He struggled to transition onto the men's circuit, and was later found guilty of match-fixing, for which he was given a seven-year ban.

Lindahl reached a career high ATP singles ranking of world No. 187, achieved on 17 May 2010. He also reached a career high ATP doubles ranking of world No. 585, achieved on 29 July 2013.

Personal life
Lindahl was born in Sweden to Swedish parents but they emigrated to Australia when he was 3 months old.

Tennis career

Early career
Lindahl first gained recognition as a tennis player when he made the Australian Open Boy's Final in 2006. He lost to French teenager Alexandre Sidorenko 6–3, 7–6 (7–4).

In August 2006, Lindahl won his first official tournament, winning the Futures event in Australia F6. He beat fellow Aussie Sadik Kadir 2–6, 6–4, 6–4.

He won his second Futures event in Indonesia F4 defeating Colin Ebelthite to retirement in the final.

Playing in his first official ATP match in the 2007 Thailand Open after qualifying and a ranking of 308 in the world, the Australian player caused a major upset defeating Sam Querrey of the United States, 59 in the world at the time, in the first round 2–6, 6–4, 6–3. Unfornately he couldn't replicate his form in the second round, losing to fellow qualifier Wang Yeu-Tzuoo 3–6, 3–6. The event earned him $6,450 and 15 ATP points.

He has won two more Futures events on the Australian Kia Pro Circuit.

Lindahl won a wildcard into the 2008 Australian Open. His first round match was against Richard Gasquet on 14 January 2008, he lost the match 0–6, 1–6, 6–3, 2–6.

After a successful 2009 campaign that had varied results on both the challenger and futures circuit, Lindahl was able to raise his ranking to a career high of 229 but finished the year at 251. After the conclusion of the 2009 season, Lindahl competed in an Australian Open Wildcard playoff tournament where he remained undefeated through the entire tournament, and beat young gun Bernard Tomic in the final in five sets to claim a place in the main draw of the 2010 Australian Open.

2010
He entered the qualifying draw for the 2010 Brisbane International. He was seeded eighth for the qualifiers and defeated Tobias Kamke 7–6(6), 7–6(6), Joel Lindner 6–7(5), 6–3, 6–4 and no. 1 seed Xavier Malisse 6–1, 7–6(2) to qualify. In the main draw, he lost to eventual semifinalist and fourth seed Tomáš Berdych 2–6, 4–6 in the first round.

He was given a wildcard to the 2010 Medibank International Sydney and was defeated by Marcos Baghdatis 2–6, 5–7. He also fell in the first round of the 2010 Australian Open to Jarkko Nieminen 6–2, 7–5, 6–4.

Lindahl's American spring of 2010 was fairly successful including two ATP qualifications in Del Ray Beach and Houston, however he fell in the opening round to Florian Mayer and Xavier Malisse respectively. In November 2010 he decided to play under the Swedish flag. In July 2011 he decided to play under the Australian flag again.

Match-fixing scandal
In December 2014, Lindahl's friend, Matthew Fox was convicted of using improper information to bet on matches. Fox alleged that Lindahl told him that he would throw a match in Toowoomba in September 2013. Lindahl retired from the sport shortly after the incident. It was also alleged that Lindahl asked Adam Feeney to lose in the first round of the Traralgon Challenger.

In January 2017, Lindahl was found guilty of charges of contriving or attempting to contrive the outcome of an event, and failing to cooperate with a Tennis Integrity Unit's investigation. He was given a seven-year ban and fined $49,000 for involvement that date back to an ITF Futures tournament in Toowoomba in September 2013.

ATP Challenger and ITF Futures finals

Singles: 16 (6–10)

Doubles: 5 (3–2)

Performance timeline

Singles

Junior Grand Slam finals

Singles: 1 (1 runner-up)

References

External links
 
 
 

1988 births
Australian male tennis players
Australian people of Swedish descent
Living people
Sportspeople from Malmö
Sportspeople from Newcastle, New South Wales
Swedish emigrants to Australia
Swedish male tennis players
Tennis people from New South Wales
Banned sportspeople
Match fixers